Ruben Buriani (born 16 March 1955) is an Italian former footballer who played as a midfielder. Following his retirement he worked as a sporting director for the Milan Youth sector.

Club career 
Buriani played 7 seasons (165 games, 10 goals in Serie A between 1977–1982) in the Serie A for A.C. Milan, A.C. Cesena, A.S. Roma and S.S.C. Napoli. A serious injury forced him to retire prematurely in 1985. He won the 1978–79 Serie A title with Milan. He made his debut with the club on the 11 September 1977, in a 1–1 away draw against Fiorentina in Serie A; he left the club following their second relegation to Serie B in 1982. In total he made 180 career appearances, scoring 14 goals, 13 of which came in Serie A, in 146 appearances.

International career 
For the Italy national football team, Buriani made two substitute appearances, which both came at the 1980 European Football Championship on home soil, in which Italy reached the semi-finals, eventually managing a fourth-place finish, under manager Enzo Bearzot.

International goals

Style of play 
A hard-working team player, Buriani was known for his tireless stamina as a midfielder.

Honours

Club 
Milan
 Serie A: 1978–79.
 Serie B: 1980–81.
 Mitropa Cup: 1982.

Monza
 Coppa Italia Serie C: 1974–75.
 Serie C: 1975–76.

Individual 
 A.C. Milan Hall of Fame

References

External links 
 

1955 births
Living people
Association football midfielders
Italian footballers
Italy international footballers
Serie A players
Serie B players
A.C. Monza players
A.C. Milan players
A.C. Cesena players
A.S. Roma players
S.S.C. Napoli players
S.P.A.L. players
UEFA Euro 1980 players